The Oddfellows Hall in Auburn, California, at 1256 Lincoln Way, was built in 1894.  It was listed on the National Register of Historic Places in 2011.

It is a three-story red brick Italianate home of IOOF Lodge No. 7, founded in 1852.  Henry T. Holmes, builder of the Hall, was a '49er and a founding father of Auburn.

References

National Register of Historic Places in Placer County, California
Italianate architecture in California
Odd Fellows buildings in California
Buildings and structures completed in 1894